Cerion iostomum is a species of air-breathing tropical land snail, a terrestrial pulmonate gastropod mollusk in the family Cerionidae.

Distribution 
Cuba

References

External links 
 http://invertebrates.si.edu/Cerion/species.cfm?species=635

Cerionidae
Gastropods described in 1854
Endemic fauna of Cuba